Literatura, Izkustvo i Kultura ( "Literature, Art and Culture"), abbreviated to LIK (ЛИК which, as a word on its own also means "image, portrait, likeness") is a monthly magazine covering its eponymous topics, published by the Bulgarian News Agency. The magazine was formerly published on a weekly basis. Its headquarters is in Sofia.

References

External links
 Official website
 WorldCat Info

Bulgarian-language magazines
Cultural magazines
Magazines with year of establishment missing
Mass media in Sofia
Monthly magazines
Weekly magazines